Arslanghali  (Arslan, Arıslan) khan  (died 1627) was a khan of the Qasim Khanate from 1614 to 1627, and  a son of Ghali khan and a grandson of Kuchum. In 1598 he was captured by the Russians during Kuchum's final defeat. In the time of Troubles he with his father fought against the False Dmitriys. Supporting Mikhail Romanov, he became a khan in the vassal Qasim Khanate, but his rule was limited and rather formal: only the Muslims and Kasimov population obeyed him.

Bibliography

References 

Qasim Khanate
1627 deaths
17th-century monarchs in Europe
Year of birth unknown